The 2019 season is the 90th season of the KLFA League, which is a Malaysian football competition featuring semi-professional and amateur clubs from Kuala Lumpur. Tentera Darat FA are the defending champions.

Super League

League table

Division 1

League table

References

External links
 Official Kuala Lumpur FA

4
Malay